The phallic catshark (Galeus priapus) is a little-known species of catshark, belonging to the family Scyliorhinidae. It is found on or near the ocean floor, in the deep waters off New Caledonia and Vanuatu. This shark is gray-colored, with four dark saddles along the back and tail.

Taxonomy
The first specimens of G. priapus were collected in the 1990s, during a series of Indo-Pacific research cruises jointly undertaken by the Institut de recherche pour le développement (IRD) and the Muséum national d'histoire naturelle (MNHN). Bernard Séret and Peter Last described the new species in a 2008 volume of the scientific journal Zootaxa. It was given the specific epithet priapus after the Greek fertility god Priapos, in reference to the distinctively long claspers of males. Within the genus, this species most closely resembles the slender sawtail catshark (G. gracilis).

Distribution and habitat

Description
Galeus priapus is a firm-bodied, very slim shark that reaches at least  in length. The head has a long, narrow parabolic shape from above. The small, horizontal eyes are placed rather high on the head, and equipped with rudimentary nictitating membranes (protective third eyelids). Beneath each eye is a prominent ridge, and behind is a tiny spiracle. The anterior rims of the nostrils bear triangular flaps of skin. The mouth is fairly large and wide, and is broadly arched. There are long, well-developed furrows that wrap around each corner of the mouth. The tooth rows number around 60 in either jaw; the teeth have a narrow central cusp flanked by 1–2 pairs of smaller cusplets. There are five pairs of gill slits.

The dorsal fins vary in shape, with the first is marginally larger than the second. The first dorsal fin originates over the posterior half of the pelvic fins, while the second originates over the middle of the anal fin. The pectoral fins are fairly large and wide, with rounded tips. The pelvic fins are short and low; adult males have characteristically long, thin claspers measuring roughly 10–11% of the total length. The anal fin is relatively small, with its base measuring 8–10% of the total length. The caudal fin is long, with a small lower lobe and a deep ventral notch near the tip of the upper lobe. The dermal denticles are small and overlapping, each with a median ridge and three marginal teeth on the crown. An elevated, saw-like crest of enlarged denticles is present along the front half of the dorsal caudal fin edge. This species is a variable shade of gray above, with a dark saddle intersecting the front half of each dorsal fin, and two more saddles along the tail. The leading margins of the pectoral fins are distinctly black, while the trailing margins of the dorsal and anal fins are whitish. The underside is pale and unmarked. The interior lining of the mouth is blackish on the roof and white elsewhere.

Biology and ecology
Little is known of the natural history of G. priapus.

Human interactions
G. priapus has been evaluated as Least Concern by the International Union for Conservation of Nature (IUCN).

References

phallic catshark
Fish of New Caledonia
Fauna of Vanuatu
phallic catshark
Taxa named by Bernard Séret
Taxa named by Peter R. Last